Lieutenant Colonel Geoffrey Charles Tasker Keyes,  (18 May 1917 – 18 November 1941) was a British Army officer of the Second World War and a recipient of the Victoria Cross, the highest award that can be made to British and Commonwealth forces for gallantry in the face of the enemy. At the time he was the youngest acting lieutenant colonel in the British Army.

Background
Keyes was the oldest son of Admiral of the Fleet Roger Keyes, 1st Baron Keyes, a British naval hero of the First World War and the first Director of Combined Operations during the Second World War. He attended King's Mead School in Seaford, Sussex, then Eton and the Royal Military College, Sandhurst.

Keyes was a member of the Marylebone Cricket Club.

Second World War

Early actions
Geoffrey Keyes was commissioned into the Royal Scots Greys. He saw action at Narvik and was later attached to No. 11 (Scottish) Commando, which was sent to the Middle East as part of Layforce.

Following the allied invasion of Syria on 8 June 1941, No. 11 Commando was sent to successfully lead the crossing of the Litani River in Lebanon, fighting against troops of the French Vichy régime, during which Keyes played a leading part. In this operation, Keyes earned the Military Cross. Following the action, 11 Commando returned to Cyprus, then to Egypt in August 1941, where the unit was left in limbo. Keyes, who had assumed command of the unit after his commanding officer, Colonel Richard Pedder, was killed during the Litani River offensive, was authorized to retain 110 volunteers as a troop in the Middle East Commando.

Operation Flipper

In October–November 1941, a plan was formulated at Eighth Army headquarters to attack Axis headquarters, base installations and communications. One objective was the assassination by a Commando team of Erwin Rommel, the commander of the Axis forces in North Africa. The raid was intended to disrupt enemy organisation before the start of Operation Crusader. Operation Flipper was led by Acting Lieutenant-Colonel Keyes with his superior, Lieutenant-Colonel Robert Laycock, joining as an observer. Keyes, who had been present throughout the planning stage, selected the most hazardous task for himself: the assault on the supposed headquarters of the Afrika Korps in a house near Beda Littoria. Following a botched landing by submarine, where over half the raiding party and their equipment failed to get ashore, the men endured an exhausting approach in torrential rain.

Keyes tried to enter the house but was confronted by a sentry. Keyes struggled in the doorway with the sentry until the guard was shot by his second-in-command. Surprise lost, Keyes, his second-in-command and a sergeant entered the building. Keyes felt faint and collapsed. Shortly after a confused period inside the house Keyes's body was carried outside by his men and left. The official version is that Keyes opened the door to a nearby room, found Germans inside, closed it again abruptly, reopened it to hurl in a grenade and was shot by one of the Germans. Only one round was fired by the Germans during the raid on the HQ. Another possible explanation for this was that his fellow Commando Captain Robin Campbell fired several rounds at the sentry, one of which probably hit Keyes and led to his death a few minutes later.
The men retreated to a position from which they were later taken prisoner. The second-in-command also had to be left since he was shot in the leg by one of his own men. On Rommel's orders, Keyes was buried with full military honours in a local Catholic cemetery. It was later ascertained that the house was not Rommel's HQ but a supply centre that he seldom if ever visited; he had been in Italy at the time of the attack. Despite the debacle, Keyes was posthumously awarded the Victoria Cross, the citation read:

Author Michael Asher has pointed out that Keyes' VC citation was written by an officer who was not an eye-witness (Robert Laycock), and is at odds with the accounts of the survivors of the raid, and with German accounts; according to Asher, there is scarcely any statement in the citation that is verifiably true. Indeed, as author James Owen points out, the post-mortem conducted by the Germans showed that he had in fact been killed accidentally by one of his own men. Asher's view is that the operation grew out of Keyes' desire to achieve the heroic status of his father, the World War I naval hero, Admiral Roger Keyes. "The Rommel Raid was born out of one man's ambition to achieve glory", he has written, "and as so many times in British history, it was rescued from ignominy by the valour and determination of ordinary enlisted men, none of whom played a part in its planning, nor were even told the nature of their mission before they embarked."

Memorials

His body was later moved to Benghazi War Cemetery in Libya. He is remembered on the King's Mead School War memorial in Seaford, Sussex and also in the parish church in the village of Tingewick in Buckinghamshire, home of the Keyes family.  His VC is on display in the Lord Ashcroft Gallery at the Imperial War Museum, London.

References

Reading list
 Keyes, Elizabeth. Geoffrey Keyes, V.C., M.C., Croix de Guerre, Royal Scots Greys, lieut.-colonel, 11th Scottish Commando (London :  G. Newnes, [1956])
 Asher, Michael. Get Rommel: The secret British mission to kill Hitler's greatest general (Cassell Military Paperbacks, [2005])
 Owen, James. Commando (Little, Brown, [2012])

External links
Lieutenant-Colonel G.C.T. Keyes in The Art of War exhibition at the UK National Archives
 Combined Operations – Operation Flipper
 

1917 births
1941 deaths
Royal Scots Greys officers
Recipients of the Military Cross
British Army personnel killed in World War II
People from Aberdour
Military personnel from Fife
British Army Commandos officers
British World War II recipients of the Victoria Cross
Heirs apparent who never acceded
Graduates of the Royal Military College, Sandhurst
Recipients of the Croix de Guerre 1939–1945 (France)
Deaths by firearm in Libya
British Army recipients of the Victoria Cross